Palestinian liberation is the concept of Palestinian nationalism, the movement of Palestinian people for self-determination and sovereignty over Palestine.

Palestinian liberation, Palestinian freedom,  or free Palestine may also refer to:

 Boycott, Divestment and Sanctions movement, political movement that advocates boycotting Israel in support of the rights of Palestinian people.
 International Solidarity Movement, a Palestinian-led movement focused on assisting the Palestinian cause in the Israeli–Palestinian conflict.
 Free Gaza Movement, a coalition of human rights activists and pro-Palestinian groups formed to break Israel’s blockade of the Gaza Strip and publicise Palestinians' treatment.
 Palestinian freedom of movement, the restriction of the movement of Palestinians by the Israeli government.
 Palestine Liberation Organization, an umbrella political organization founded in 1964 to centralize the leadership of various Palestinian groups and recognized by the United Nations as the representative of the Palestinian people.